Félix Chemla Lamèch (1894 – 1962) was a French
meteorologist and selenographer.

He was born in Aryanah, Tunisia, and went to the University of Athens where he studied meteorology. He built an observatory in Corfu in 1927, and additional observatories in France, Africa, and South America. He also produced several maps of the moon and published several papers on astronomy in the Ciel et Terre.

The crater Lamèch on the Moon is named after him.

References

1894 births
1962 deaths
National and Kapodistrian University of Athens alumni
20th-century French astronomers
French meteorologists
People from Aryanah